Christian Church, also known as Fitches Bridge Church, is a historic church on NY 10 at East Delhi in Delaware County, New York.  It was built in 1861 and is in the Greek Revival style with an overlay of Gothic Revival decoration.  It is a small rectangular structure of post and beam construction.  It features 12 narrow, engaged towers with pinnacles that mark the corners of the building.

It was added to the National Register of Historic Places in 2001.

See also
National Register of Historic Places listings in Delaware County, New York

References

Churches in Delaware County, New York
Churches completed in 1861
National Register of Historic Places in Delaware County, New York
Churches on the National Register of Historic Places in New York (state)
Greek Revival church buildings in New York (state)
Carpenter Gothic church buildings in New York (state)
1861 establishments in New York (state)